The Metropolitan & Suburban 4-6-2T of 1896 was a South African steam locomotive from the pre-Union era in the Cape of Good Hope.

In 1896, two 4-6-2 Pacific type tank locomotives entered service on the Metropolitan and Suburban Railway, which operated a suburban passenger service between Cape Town and Sea Point. In 1901, both locomotives were sold to the Mashonaland Railway.

Metropolitan & Suburban Railway
In 1887, the Green and Seapoint Company began the construction of the Sea Point Line, a railway line from Cape Town to Sea Point, with the aim to provide a suburban train service to the expanding urban area along the coast behind Signal Hill and Lion's Head.

A second enterprise, the Cape Town and Suburban Railway Company, took over the track with plans to extend it, but it failed to have trains running by the 1888 deadline stipulated by the Cape Government and so also went out of business.

A third company, the Metropolitan and Suburban Railway Company, was formed to carry on with the line and it was finally opened to public traffic in September 1892. The first locomotives were a pair of 1875 1st Class  engines, numbers 3 and 4, which were acquired from the Cape Government Railways. These were used during construction and, once the line was opened, also in revenue service.

Manufacturer
Two 4-6-2 Pacific type tank locomotives, built by John Fowler and Company with works numbers 7450 and 7451, were delivered to the Metropolitan and Suburban Railway Company in 1896, at a purchase price of £2,167 6s 1d each. The locomotives were named Seapoint and Greenpoint respectively.

Service

Sea Point Line
The engines Seapoint and Greenpoint were placed in service in 1896, but they derailed regularly since the curves in the tracks leading up from the Table Bay Harbour dock area to Green Point Common proved to be too sharp for their  coupled-and-trailing wheelbase. They were therefore soon withdrawn from service and staged, awaiting sale.

The railway itself faced stiff competition from the newly introduced tram service and went out of business in 1898, after a train collision which resulted in serious injury to a solicitor. The matter ended in litigation, with a judgment against the railway for £3,000 in damages.

The Sea Point line was resuscitated by the Cape Government Railways in 1905 and, in 1927, was even electrified by the South African Railways at considerable expense, but it was never profitable and was finally closed in 1929.

Mashonaland Railway
The two locomotives were purchased by the Mashonaland Railway in 1901. The engine Seapoint became Mashonaland no. 5 and was renamed Inyanga, while the engine Greenpoint became no. 6 and was renamed Paulington. They remained in service on the Mashonaland Railway into the early 1920s. The engine Inyanga was sold in November 1921 and the engine Paulington in August 1924, both to a contractor in Elisabethville in the Belgian Congo.

References

0580
4-6-2 locomotives
2′C1′ n2t locomotives
4-6-2T locomotives
Fowler locomotives
Cape gauge railway locomotives
Railway locomotives introduced in 1896
1896 in South Africa
Scrapped locomotives